A list of films produced in the Soviet Union in 1961 (see 1961 in film).

1961

See also
1961 in the Soviet Union

References

External links
 Soviet films of 1961 at the Internet Movie Database

1961
Lists of 1961 films by country or language
Films